The Foreign Corrupt Practices Act of 1977 (FCPA) (et seq.) is a United States federal law that prohibits U.S. citizens and entities from bribing foreign government officials to benefit their business interests.

The FCPA is applicable worldwide and extends specifically to publicly traded companies and their personnel, including officers, directors, employees, shareholders, and agents. Following amendments made in 1998, the Act also applies to foreign firms and persons who, either directly or through intermediaries, help facilitate or carry out corrupt payments in U.S. territory.

Pursuant to its anti-bribery purpose, the FCPA amends the Securities Exchange Act of 1934 to require all companies with securities listed in the U.S. to meet certain accounting provisions, such as ensuring accurate and transparent financial records and maintaining internal accounting controls.

The FCPA is jointly enforced by the Department of Justice (DOJ) and the Securities and Exchange Commission (SEC), which apply criminal and civil penalties respectively.

Since its passage, the FCPA has been subject to controversy and criticism, namely whether its enforcement discourages U.S. companies from investing abroad. The Act was subsequently amended in 1988 to raise the standard of proof for a finding of bribery.

Provisions and scope 
The core aim of the Foreign Corrupt Practices Act (FCPA) is to prohibit companies and their individual officers from influencing foreign officials with any personal payments or rewards. The FCPA applies to any person who has a certain degree of connection to the United States and engages in corrupt practices abroad, as well as to U.S. businesses, foreign corporations trading securities in the U.S., American nationals, citizens, and residents acting in furtherance of a foreign corrupt practice, whether or not they are physically present in the U.S. This is considered the nationality principle of the Act. Any individuals involved in these activities may face prison time.

In the case of foreign natural and legal persons, the Act covers their deeds if they are in the U.S. at the time of the corrupt conduct. This is considered the protective principle of the Act. Moreover, the FCPA governs not only direct payments to foreign officials, candidates, and parties, but payments made to any other recipient in furtherance of influencing a foreign official, candidate, or party. These payments are not restricted to monetary forms and may include anything of value. This is considered the territoriality principle of the act.

The FCPA is subject to ongoing scholarly and congressional debate regarding its effects on international commerce. Scholars have found that its enforcement discourages U.S. firms from investing in foreign markets. This coincides with the well established observation that companies engaging in mergers and acquisitions in emerging markets face a uniquely increased level of regulatory and corruption risk.

Persons subject to the FCPA

 Issuers
 The term "issuer" is used to describe any U.S. or foreign corporation that has a class of securities registered, or that is required to file reports under the Securities and Exchange Act of 1934 (15 U.S.C. § 78dd-1)

 Domestic concerns
 Refers to any individual who is a citizen, national, or resident of the U.S. and any business entity organized under the laws of the U.S. or one of its states, or having its principal place of business in the U.S. (15 U.S.C. § 78dd-2)

 Any legal person
 Covers both enterprises and individuals (15 U.S.C. § 78dd-3)

History
In 1975 and 1976, American public life was shaken by dozens of scandals involving bribery of foreign officials by prominent American companies. These disclosures, driven by Securities and Exchange Commission (SEC) enforcement actions and high-profile public hearings by the Church Subcommittee on Multinational Corporations, made headlines for months causing serious problems for foreign leaders important to the United States. Some of the most sensational disclosures involved corrupt payments by Northrop, Lockheed, United Brands, Gulf Oil, and Mobile in Saudi Arabia, Japan, Honduras, Korea, Italy, and the Netherlands. The headlines were punctuated by suicides of corporate executives and foreign officials. One CEO [chief executive officer] jumped out a window. A European dignitary stepped in front of a streetcar.

Investigations by the U.S. Securities and Exchange Commission in the mid-1970s revealed that over 400 U.S. companies admitted making questionable or illegal payments in excess of $300 million to foreign government officials, politicians, and political parties. The abuses ran the gamut from bribery of high foreign officials to secure some type of favorable action by a foreign government, to so-called facilitating payments that were made to ensure that government functionaries discharged certain ministerial or clerical duties. If the official has no choice but to bribe, and bribery is legal in the country, bribing is seen as necessary for "greasing the wheels", i.e. facilitating the conduct of business. Among the major examples of such practices were the Lockheed bribery scandals, in which officials of aerospace company Lockheed paid foreign officials in several countries to favor their company's products, and the Bananagate scandal, in which Chiquita Brands bribed the President of Honduras for more favorable government policies.

In response to these high-profile revelations, Congress enacted the FCPA to bring a halt to the bribery of foreign officials and to restore public confidence in the integrity of the American business system. The Act was signed into law by President Jimmy Carter on December 19, 1977. The first criminal enforcement action under the Act was against Finbar Kenny. Kenny had advanced Sir Albert Henry, Prime Minister of the Cook Islands, $337,000 from postage stamp revenue for Henry's re-election campaign. In 1979, Kenny became the first American to plead guilty of violating the FCPA, and was fined $50,000.

The Act was first amended by the Omnibus Trade and Competitiveness Act of 1988, where Title V is known as the 'Foreign Corrupt Practices Act Amendments of 1988'. It introduced a "knowing" standard in order to find violations of the Act, encompassing "conscious disregard" and "willful blindness." Other amendments were for "bona fide", "reasonable" and lawful gifts under the laws of the foreign country.

The second amendment was the International Anti-Bribery Act of 1998 which was designed to implement the OECD Anti-Bribery Convention, i.e., to include certain foreign persons and extend the scope beyond U.S. borders.

The FCPA dominated international anti-corruption enforcement from its introduction until  when other countries began introducing broader and more robust legislation, notably the United Kingdom Bribery Act 2010. The International Organization for Standardization introduced an international anti-bribery management system standard in 2016. In recent years, cooperation in enforcement action between countries has increased.

Enforcement

The Securities and Exchange Commission (SEC) and the Department of Justice (DOJ) are jointly responsible for enforcing the FCPA, since it amends both an SEC Act and the criminal code. SEC enforcement applies to companies regulated by the SEC while the DOJ enforces the Act against individuals and domestic companies entities not regulated by the SEC. However, enforcement by one agency does not preclude enforcement by the other, and on numerous occasions the DOJ and SEC have initiated enforcement actions against the same company for violations of the FCPA.  In 2010 the SEC created a specialized unit for FCPA enforcement.
In 2012, the SEC and the DOJ issued their first joint guide to the FCPA, the second edition of this guide was published in 2020.

Requirements
The anti-bribery provisions of the FCPA make it unlawful for a U.S. person, and certain foreign issuers of securities, to make a payment to a foreign official for the purpose of obtaining or retaining business for or with, or directing business to, any person. Since the 1998 Amendment of FCPA they also apply to foreign firms and persons who take any act in furtherance of such a corrupt payment while in the U.S. the meaning of foreign official is broad. For example, an owner of a bank who is also the minister of finance would count as a foreign official according to the U.S. government. Doctors at government-owned or managed hospitals are also considered to be foreign officials under the FCPA, as is anyone working for a government-owned or managed institution or enterprise. Employees of international organizations such as the United Nations are also considered to be foreign officials under the FCPA. A 2014 federal appellate court decision has provided guidance on how the term "foreign official" is defined under FCPA.

Because the Act concerns the intent of the bribery rather than the amount, there is no requirement of materiality. Offering anything of value as a bribe, whether cash or non-cash items, is prohibited. This can even include paying for travel for foreign government officials, when it considered "excessive."

The FCPA also requires companies whose securities are listed in the U.S. to meet its accounting provisions. These accounting provisions operate in tandem with the anti-bribery provisions of the FCPA, and require respective corporations to make and keep books and records that accurately and fairly reflect the transactions of the corporation and to devise and maintain an adequate system of internal accounting controls. An increasing number of corporations are taking additional steps to protect their reputation and reduce their exposure by employing the services of due diligence companies tasked with vetting third party intermediaries and identifying easily overlooked government officials embedded in otherwise privately held foreign firms. This strategy is one element of an effective FCPA Compliance Program, as it shows a sincere attempt to avoid business situations where high risk (prior history or proximity to unethical behavior) individuals are concerned.

Regarding payments to foreign officials, the act draws a distinction between bribery and facilitation or "grease payments", which may be permissible under the FCPA, but may still violate local laws. The primary distinction is that grease payments or facilitation payments are made to an official to expedite his performance of the routine duties he is already bound to perform. The exception focuses on the purpose of the payment rather than on its value. Payments to foreign officials may be legal under the FCPA if the payments are permitted under the written laws of the host country. Certain payments or reimbursements relating to product promotion may also be permitted under the FCPA.

A U.S. company acquiring a foreign firm could face successor liability for FCPA violations committed by the foreign firm prior to being acquired. Generally, acquiring companies may be liable as a successor for pre-existing FCPA violations committed by an acquired company where those violations were subject to the FCPA's jurisdiction when committed. This position was further confirmed by the DOJ in a 2014 opinion stating that pre-acquisition conduct by a foreign target company without a jurisdictional nexus to the U.S. would not be subject to FCPA enforcement.

Anti-bribery/anti-corruption (ABAC) solutions

Businesses increasingly focus on their core competencies, and as a result engage more third parties to provide critical business functions. Companies do not have direct control over their third-party providers, which expose them to regulatory and reputational risk of FCPA violations by those third parties. Under the FCPA, businesses are accountable for activities involving both their internal and external relationships. Companies that operate internationally, or that engage third parties in countries with a high Corruption Perceptions Index, are especially at risk.  Many companies have now adopted "anti-bribery/anti-corruption" (ABAC) solutions to combat this risk and help protect themselves from fines and reputational damage.

ABAC compliance solutions are a subset of third party management. These systems can automatically manage third party information and monitor their ongoing activities in compliance with FCPA regulation.

Application
Stronger DOJ and SEC enforcement has increased the prominence of the FCPA from 2010 onwards. The SEC website shows a complete list of enforcement cases since 1978. Notable select cases of the application of FCPA since 2008 are with ALCOA, Biomet, Bizjet, Hewlett Packard Company, KBR, Marubeni Corporation, News Corporation, Siemens, Smith & Nephew and Walmart de Mexico as follows:

In 2008, Siemens AG paid $450 million in criminal fines to the DOJ and $350 million to the SEC for violating the FCPA. This is one of the largest penalties ever collected for an FCPA case.

In 2012, Japanese firm Marubeni Corporation paid a criminal penalty of US$54.6 million for FCPA violations when acting as an agent of the TKSJ joint venture, which comprised Technip, Snamprogetti Netherlands B.V., Kellogg Brown & Root Inc., and JGC Corporation. Between 1995 and 2004, the joint venture won four contracts in Nigeria worth more than US$6 billion, as a direct result of having paid US$51 million to Marubeni to be used to bribe Nigerian government officials.

In 2012 Smith & Nephew paid US$22.2 million to the DOJ and SEC, and Bizjet International Sales and Support Inc. paid US$11.8 million to the DOJ for bribery of foreign government officials. Both companies entered into a deferred prosecution agreement.

In March 2012, Biomet Inc. paid a criminal fine of US$17.3 million to resolve charges of FCPA violations and US$5.5 million in disgorgement of profits and pre-judgment interest to the SEC.

In January 2014, ALCOA paid $175 million in disgorgement of revenues and a fine of $209 million to settle charges that its Australian bauxite mining subsidiary retained an agent that made bribes to government officials in Bahrain and to officers of Aluminum Bahrain B.S.C. to secure long-term contracts to supply the company with bauxite ore.

In March 2014, Marubeni Corporation agreed with the DOJ to pay a US$88 million fine after pleading guilty to taking part in a scheme to pay bribes to high ranking Indonesian officials in order to secure a lucrative power project.

On February 24, 2015, the Goodyear Tire and Rubber Company "Goodyear" agreed to pay more than $16 million to settle FCPA charges that two of its African subsidiaries allegedly paid $3.2 million in bribes that generated $14,122,535 in illicit profits. The SEC FCPA charges involved Goodyear subsidiaries in Kenya and Angola for allegedly paying bribes to government and private-sector workers in exchange for sales in each country. According to the SEC because "Goodyear did not prevent or detect these improper payments because it failed to implement adequate FCPA compliance controls at its subsidiaries" and, for the Kenyan subsidiary, "because it failed to conduct adequate due diligence" prior to its acquisition. It was not alleged that Goodyear had any involvement with or knowledge of its subsidiaries' improper conduct.

In July 2017, Ng Lap Seng, a Macau-based Chinese billionaire real estate businessman, chairman of the Sun Kian Ip Group (新建业集团), and a member of the National Committee of the Chinese People's Political Consultative Conference (CPPCC), was convicted after a five-week trial of two counts of violating the Foreign Corrupt Practices Act, one count of paying bribes and gratuities, one count of money laundering and two counts of conspiracy. In 2018 Ng Lap Seng was sentenced to 48 months in prison and three years of supervised release for his role in a scheme to bribe United Nations ambassadors to obtain support to build a conference center in Macau that would host, among other events, the annual United Nations Global South-South Development Expo (GSSD Expo) organised by the United Nations Office for South-South Cooperation (UNOSSC), then headed by Chinese national Yiping Zhou.

Charges
In 2009, former Representative William J. Jefferson, Democrat of Louisiana, was charged with violating the FCPA by bribing African governments for business interests.
 
In 2010 the DOJ and the SEC were investigating whether Hewlett Packard Company executives paid about $10.9 million in bribery money between 2004 and 2006 to the Prosecutor General of Russia "to win a €35 million contract to supply computer equipment throughout Russia." On September 11, 2014, HP Russia pleaded guilty before U.S. District Judge D. Lowell Jensen of the Northern District of California to conspiracy and substantive violations of the anti-bribery and accounting provisions of the FCPA. The court sentenced HP Russia to pay a $58,772,250 fine.

In July 2011, the DOJ opened an inquiry into the News International phone hacking scandal that brought down News of the World, the recently closed UK tabloid newspaper. In cooperation with the Serious Fraud Office (United Kingdom), the DOJ was to examine whether News Corporation violated the FCPA by bribing British police officers. Nine police officers were convicted including a senior officer in the Met counter-terrorism command, Det Ch Insp April Casburn, former Met anti-terrorism officer Timothy Edwards, former police officer Simon Quinn, former Met officer Paul Flattley and Scott Chapman, an ex-prison officer.

An April 2012 article in the New York Times reported that a former executive of Walmart de México y Centroamérica alleged in September 2005 that Walmart de Mexico had paid bribes to officials throughout Mexico in order to obtain construction permits, that Walmart investigators found credible evidence that Mexican and American laws had been broken, and that Walmart executives in the U.S. "hushed up" the allegations. According to an article in Bloomberg, Wal-Mart's "probe of possible bribery in Mexico may prompt executive departures and steep U.S. government fines if it reveals senior managers knew about the payments and didn't take strong enough action, corporate governance experts said." Eduardo Bohorquez, the director of Transparencia Mexicana, a "watchdog" group in Mexico, urged the Mexican government to investigate the allegations. Wal-Mart and the US Chamber of Commerce had participated in a campaign to amend FCPA; according to proponents, the changes would clarify the law, while according to opponents, the changes would weaken the law.

Other cases are with Avon Products, Invision Technologies, BAE Systems, Baker Hughes, Daimler AG, Monsanto, Halliburton, Titan Corporation, Triton Energy Limited, Lucent Technologies.

Exception 
As a general principle of the Foreign Corrupt Practices Act (FCPA), in the United States, firms and businesses in the US are prohibited from making any payments to foreign officials for routine governmental action. However, any payment that does not affect the decision of the foreign official is not considered a bribe. For example, a businessman in the States may make a payment to a government official to expedite a deal or transaction. Such a payment is considered a grease payment (and not a bribe), which is lawful under FCPA.

In this regard, it becomes necessary to understand when an amount paid turns from a grease payment to a bribe, which is illegal under law. This is a grey area under the law which is still to be clarified. There are numerous factors that could play a role in demarcation between the two, which include: the amount of payment, the frequency of the payment, the status/level of the foreign official to whom the payment has been made, the outcome of the case regarding which the payment was made, etc.

See also
 Bribery Act 2010 in the United Kingdom
 Convention against Corruption (disambiguation)
 Corruption of Foreign Public Officials Act in Canada
 Financial Action Task Force on Money Laundering, another international agreement
 OECD Anti-Bribery Convention, an international agreement
 Politically exposed person, a term used in several jurisdictions

References

External links

 Foreign Corrupt Practices Act of 1977 (PDF/details) as amended in the GPO Statute Compilations collection
 Chinese businesswoman pleads guilty to bribing UN honcho
 Oral History, Mark B. Feldman, Association Foreign Studies and Training p. 97 https://adst.org/OH%20TOCs/Feldman.Mark.pdf 

 US Department of Justice page on the FCPA
 Chairman Of Macau-Based Real Estate Development Company Convicted At Trial On All Counts In In Connection With United Nations Bribery Scheme
 Former Head Of Foundation Sentenced To 20 Months In Prison For Bribing Then-Ambassador And President Of United Nations General Assembly
 Former UN General Assembly President and Five Others Charged in $1.3 Million Bribery Scheme
 UNITED STATES V. FRANCIS LORENZO, DOCKET NO. 15-CR-00706-VSB-2
 UNITED STATES V. JEFF C YIN, DOCKET NO. 15-CR-00706-VSB
 UNITED STATES V. JULIA VIVI WANG, DOCKET NO. 16-CR-00495
 UNITED STATES V. NG LAP SENG, DOCKET NO. 15-CR-00706-VSB 

1977 in law
United States business law
United States federal criminal legislation
United States federal securities legislation
United States foreign relations legislation
United States federal public corruption crime